The 2013–14 Stetson Hatters men's basketball team represented Stetson University during the 2013–14 NCAA Division I men's basketball season. The Hatters, led by first year head coach Corey Williams, played their home games at the Edmunds Center and were members of the Atlantic Sun Conference. They finished the season 7–24, 5–13 in A-Sun play to finish in a tie for eighth place. They lost in the quarterfinals of the Atlantic Sun tournament to Florida Gulf Coast.

Roster

Schedule

 
|-
!colspan=9 style="background:#; color:#FFFFFF;"| Exhibition

|-
!colspan=9 style="background:#; color:#FFFFFF;"| Regular season

|-
!colspan=9 style="background:#; color:#FFFFFF;"| Atlantic Sun tournament

References

Stetson Hatters men's basketball seasons
Stetson
Stetson Hatters
Stetson Hatters